Xenomystax is a genus of eels in the family Congridae. It currently contains the following species:

 Xenomystax atrarius C. H. Gilbert, 1891 (Deepwater conger)
 Xenomystax austrinus D. G. Smith & Kanazawa, 1989
 Xenomystax bidentatus (Reid, 1940)
 Xenomystax congroides D. G. Smith & Kanazawa, 1989 (Bristletooth conger)
 Xenomystax trucidans Alcock, 1894

References

Congridae